Huang Hongpin (born April 23, 1989) is a Chinese basketball player for Shanxi Flame and the Chinese national team, where she participated at the 2014 FIBA World Championship.

References

External links

1989 births
Living people
Chinese women's basketball players
Centers (basketball)
Shanxi Flame players
Basketball players at the 2016 Summer Olympics
Olympic basketball players of China
Basketball players from Guangxi
People from Chongzuo
Guangdong Vermilion Birds players